Samuel Mathews or Matthews may refer to:

 Samuel Mathews (colonial Virginia governor) (1630–1660), colonial governor of Virginia
 Samuel Matthews (captain) (died 1657), Virginia planter, political figure, and the father of governor Samuel Mathews
 Sam Matthews (Samuel Lloyd Matthews, born 1997), English footballer
 Samuel Matthews (hermit) or the Dulwich Hermit (died 1802), London hermit known for his unresolved murder
 Sam Mathews, founder of esports organization Fnatic

See also
Governor Mathews (disambiguation)